Ville Lyytikäinen (4 February 1967 – 19 December 2016) was a Finnish football coach, born in  Helsinki. His last work was head coach of Atlantis FC in Finland's second highest tier, Ykkönen.

In the past Lyytikäinen coached FC Jokerit, FC Hämeenlinna and FC Honka. In 2005, he was sacked from Honka after only a couple of matches and moved to the coach of FC Futura in Kolmonen, the 4th highest tier and stayed in that job to the end of the season 2006. In Atlantis Lyytikäinen started at the beginning of season 2007.

Lyytikäinen has also coached the football team of Pohjois-Haagan yhteiskoulu sports high school and was also known as the football commentator in Peliuutiset sports show in television channel YLE TV2. Before the career of football coach Lyytikäinen was a  regular star in paint product television commercials. He has also starred in Vääpeli Körmy movies. Lyytikäinen died at the age of 49 in 2016.

References

1967 births
2016 deaths
Sportspeople from Helsinki
Finnish football managers
Finnish male actors